Richard Bryant (1847 – 27 October 1931) was an Australian cricketer. He played two first-class matches for New South Wales between 1882/83 and 1884/85.

See also
 List of New South Wales representative cricketers

References

External links
 

1847 births
1931 deaths
Australian cricketers
New South Wales cricketers
People from Maitland, New South Wales
Cricketers from New South Wales